Baltic State Technical University "Voenmeh" D.F. Ustinov (abbreviated BGTU) is a Russian technical university situated in Saint Petersburg. Previously it was known as the Leningrad Mechanical Institute and Military Mechanical Institute.

History
 1932: Established by order of the People's Commissariat of Heavy Industry of the USSR, as the Leningrad Military Mechanical Institute
 1992: Reformed as Baltic State Technical University, after D.F. Ustinov

Faculties

 Rocket and Space Technology Faculty (A)
 Arms and Weapons Systems Faculty (E)
 Department of Information and Control Systems (I)
 Natural Science (O)
 International Industrial Management and Communications (R)

Notable alumni
 Dmitriy Feodorovich Ustinov (Marshal of the USSR, the Minister of Defense of the USSR from July 30, 1976 to December 20, 1984)
 Vladimir Fyedorovich Utkin (Chief designer of KB "Yuzhnoye", Dnepropetrovsk, the USSR, Two Times Hero of Socialist Labour, chief designer of the SS-18 "Satan" (R-36TM), SS-24 (RT-23) ICBMs)
 Sergei Krikalev (cosmonaut)
 Georgi Grechko (cosmonaut)
 Vladimir Yakunin (head of Russian Railways)
 Vladimir Okrepilov (academician of Russian Academy of Sciences RAS, general director of State Centre "Test-St.Petersburg")

References

External links
 Baltic State Technical University - official Site (rus)

Universities in Saint Petersburg
Educational institutions established in 1932
1932 establishments in the Soviet Union
Technical universities and colleges in Russia